SpaceMETA is a Brazilian Group founded in 2010 to explore aerospace opportunities motivated by Google Lunar XPrize Competition

As one of the less than 30 active teams around the world (as of 2012), and selected to participate in a competition that offers US$30 MM for who first lands on the lunar surface and succeed to realize several special milestones (like send picture and movies to the earth, survive some days there, context some ancient sites from old missions, and walk 500 meters)., in its first mission, SpaceMETA decided to participate bringing rupture ideas to the race, considering to use at minimum level conventional and already used old age space technologies and solutions. SpaceMETA was the last team to be selected by the X Prize Foundation to participate on the GLXP, and the only one selected from Brazil.

History 
SpaceMETA was initially sponsored by Intel Corporation which has the first right refusal for a first round of investment on a success case basis.

Founders 
SpaceMETA was founded by Sergio Cabral Cavalcanti, a researcher from  Federal University of Rio de Janeiro.

Teams 
First Team ( 2010 )
SpaceMETA first Team was formed by
- Sergio Cabra; Cavalcanti ( founder )
- Juliana Laxe
- Nelson Marques
- Laurent Gil
- And several professors from UFRJ ( Federal University of Rio de Janeiro ) and UERJ ( State University of Rio de Janeiro )

After 10 years of Project development and several world roadshow with Google GLXP, and fund raise, SpaceMETA start to build its second team and have moved its first goal to a low orbit goal to deploy an ionic powered engine to make power test before start a moon movement.

Second Team ( 2020 )
- Sergio Cabral Cavalcanti ( founder )
- Juliana Laxe
- Davi Clemente Monteiro Correia
- Scientist Charles Duvoisin Instituto IBCI

Presentations 
All SpaceMETA presentations can be found at www.slideshare.net/ideavalley123

Joint Venture with Synergy Moon 
SpaceMETA and several other teams has join Synergy Moon as one of the 5 finalist teams to land on the Moon using a possible Orbital Rocket as a primary payload or as Indian rocketas a second payload.
As a premise to don't use a comoditie project Falcon 9 from SpaceX, Sergio Cabral Cavalcanti, founder os SpaceMETA has declared that the teas was more interested on an independent innovation once Falcon 9 has Merlin Engine no news differente from Saturn V from Rockectdine engines, despites its fantastic technology project.

Mission overview 

SpaceMETA  Mission Overview Summary, as presented to the XPrize Committee,  has proposed several rupture innovation approach for its mission. Actually the disclosed innovations are related with the following technical approaches:
 
 Usage of ethanol as rocket fuel
 Launch the vehicle not from the ground but a lifted launch using balloons / auxiliary craft
 Usage of inflatable structures instead, to transport big things that should be armed there (like antennas and solar panels)
 Infinity Motion - SpaceMETA doesn't use conventional energy system to create movement on the moon rover (called Solitaire  (x-Frog and x-Blob)), but a NITINOL and Coil based kinetic energy converter called Infinity Motion.
 Send information to the Earth not using electromagnetic waves, but a special Optical Modulation reflecting the solar light
 During the movement of the Lunar Modules on the Surface, usage of the contact/impact process, so imbedded sensors will capture the echoes above the surface
 Geographically, SpaceMETA plans to visit some SETI / Scientific related sites of interest on the Moon

Gallery

References 

 Intel Sponsorship to SpaceMETA 
 News on SpaceMETA 
 SpaceMETA on the Epoca Magazine 
 SpaceMETA on the ISTOE Magazine 
 SpaceMETA Joint venture with Synergy Moon 
 Patent Eletromagnetic Protection at al

External links 
 
 Official SpaceMETA website at GLXP
 About Intel Sponsorship to SpaceMETA 
 About SpaceMETA SocialNet Facebook 
 About Founders Sergio Cabral Cavalcanti Interview 
 SpaceMETA – Intel Interview 
 Eletromagnetic Tinta Aeroespacial – Eletromagnetic 

Brazilian companies established in 2000
Engineering companies of Brazil
Aerospace companies of Brazil
Google Lunar X Prize
Private spaceflight companies
Cancelled spacecraft
Robotics organizations
Science and technology in Brazil
Technology companies established in 2000
Brazilian brands